The 1879 Maryland gubernatorial election took place on November 6, 1879.

Incumbent Democratic Governor John Lee Carroll did not seek re-election.

Democratic candidate William Thomas Hamilton defeated Republican candidate James Albert Gary.

General election

Candidates
William Thomas Hamilton, Democratic, former U.S. Senator
James Albert Gary, Republican, businessman, Republican nominee for Maryland's 5th congressional district in 1870
Howard Meeks, National Greenback-Labor

Results

Notes

References

1879
Gubernatorial
Maryland